Rella Aylestock Braithwaite (January 29, 1923 – July 23, 2019) was a Canadian author.

She was born in Mapleton, Ontario, a descendant of Black pioneers who settled in the Queen's Bush area, and was educated in Listowel, Ontario.  In 1946, Braithwaite and her husband Bob settled in the Toronto suburb of Scarborough Township; she served on the local school board. She wrote a column on Black history for the Contrast newspaper. In 1975, Braithwaite published The Black Woman in Canada on outstanding Canadian Black women. She also helped the Ministry of Education in Ontario develop a Black Studies guide for use in the classroom.

Her daughter is singer Diana Braithwaite.

References 

1923 births
2019 deaths
Black Canadian writers
Canadian women journalists
Journalists from Ontario
Canadian women historians